WWBZ may refer to:

 WWBZ-LP, a low-power radio station (102.5 FM) licensed to serve Hyden, Kentucky, United States
 WQVD, a radio station (700 AM) licensed to Orange–Athol, Massachusetts, United States, which used the call sign WWBZ from April to September 2014
 WTMZ-FM, a radio station (98.9 FM) licensed to McClellanville, South Carolina, United States, which used the call sign WWBZ from 1994 to 2004
 WKSC-FM, a radio station (103.5 FM) licensed to Chicago, Illinois, United States which used the call sign WWBZ from 1991 to 1994
 WNJC, a radio station (1360 AM) licensed to Washington Township, New Jersey, United States, which used the call sign WWBZ from 1948 to 1990 while licensed to nearby Vineland

See also 
 WBZ (disambiguation)